The 2023 Morehouse Maroon Tigers volleyball team, the second ever Morehouse volleyball team represents Morehouse College in the 2023 NCAA Division I & II men's volleyball season. The Maroon Tigers, led by first year head coach Ashley Johnson, play their home games at Forbes Arena. The Maroon Tigers compete as members of the Southern Intercollegiate Athletic Conference. Morehouse was picked to finish sixth in the 2023 SIAC preseason poll.

Season highlights
Will be filled in as the season progresses.

Roster

Schedule
TV/Internet Streaming information:
Select home games will be streamed on HBCU League Pass+. Most road games will also be streamed by the schools streaming service.

 *-Indicates conference match.
 Times listed are Eastern Time Zone.

Announcers for televised games
Mount Olive: 
Reinhardt: 
Reinhardt: 
Life: 
St. Andrews: 
Benedict: 
Tusculum: 
Tusculum: 
Kentucky State:
Central State: 
Belmont Abbey: 
Fort Valley State: 
Benedict: 
Life: 
Edward Waters: 
Central State: 
Kentucky State: 
Edward Waters:

References

2023 in sports in Georgia (U.S. state)
Morehouse
2023 Southern Intercollegiate Athletic Conference men's volleyball season